Narve Bonna (16 January 1901 – 2 March 1976) was a Norwegian ski jumper.

Born in Bærum and representing Lommedalens IL, Bonna won the first Olympic ski jumping silver medal at the 1924 Winter Olympics in Chamonix.

External links
 
 

1901 births
1976 deaths
Sportspeople from Bærum
Olympic silver medalists for Norway
Olympic ski jumpers of Norway
Ski jumpers at the 1924 Winter Olympics
Olympic medalists in ski jumping
Medalists at the 1924 Winter Olympics
20th-century Norwegian people